Joseph Coombs (born June 15, 1952 in Montrose, Chaguanas) is a retired athlete from Trinidad and Tobago who specialized in the 400 metres and 4 x 400 metres relay.

He attended the University of Alabama.

He now resides with his wife and his children.

International competitions

References

Best of Trinidad
sports-reference

1952 births
Living people
Trinidad and Tobago male sprinters
Olympic athletes of Trinidad and Tobago
Athletes (track and field) at the 1976 Summer Olympics
Athletes (track and field) at the 1980 Summer Olympics
Commonwealth Games medallists in athletics
Commonwealth Games silver medallists for Trinidad and Tobago
Athletes (track and field) at the 1978 Commonwealth Games
Pan American Games competitors for Trinidad and Tobago
Athletes (track and field) at the 1979 Pan American Games
Central American and Caribbean Games silver medalists for Trinidad and Tobago
Central American and Caribbean Games bronze medalists for Trinidad and Tobago
Competitors at the 1978 Central American and Caribbean Games
Competitors at the 1982 Central American and Caribbean Games
Central American and Caribbean Games medalists in athletics
Medallists at the 1978 Commonwealth Games